Trigonopterus florensis is a species of flightless weevil in the genus Trigonopterus from Indonesia.

Etymology
The specific name is derived from that of the island of Flores.

Description
Individuals measure 1.48–2.04 mm in length.  General coloration is black, with rust colored antennae and tarsi.  The elytra vary between black and dark rust-colored.

Range
The species is found around elevations of  around Golo Lusang, Mount Ranaka, and Lake Ranamese on the island of Flores, part of the Indonesian province of East Nusa Tenggara.

Phylogeny
T. florensis is part of the T. relictus species group.  The species is similar morphologically to T. paraflorensis and T. pseudoflorensis.

References

florensis
Beetles described in 2014
Beetles of Asia
Insects of Indonesia